The 1990 Macau Grand Prix Formula Three was the 37th Macau Grand Prix race to be held on the streets of Macau on 25 November 1990. It was the seventh edition for Formula Three cars. Michael Schumacher won after Mika Hakkinen had tried to overtake but Schumacher deliberately blocked the move and Hakkinen crashed from behind. This started a rivalry between the two that would last until Mika's retirement in 2001.

Entry list

Race Results

References

External links
 The official website of the Macau Grand Prix

Macau Grand Prix
Grand
Macau